Adoxia is a genus of skeletonizing leaf beetles in the family Chrysomelidae. There are more than 60 described species in Adoxia, found in Australia and New Zealand.

Species
These 63 species belong to the genus Adoxia:

 Adoxia aenea Broun, 1880
 Adoxia aenescens (Sharp, 1886)
 Adoxia angularia (Broun, 1909)
 Adoxia anthracina (Broun, 1914)
 Adoxia asperella (Broun, 1909)
 Adoxia atripennis (Broun, 1913)
 Adoxia attenuata Broun, 1880
 Adoxia aurella (Broun, 1914)
 Adoxia australis (Jacoby, 1886)
 Adoxia axyrocharis (Broun, 1909)
 Adoxia benallae (Blackburn, 1891)
 Adoxia brevicollis (Broun, 1893)
 Adoxia bullata (Broun, 1914)
 Adoxia calcarata (Broun, 1893)
 Adoxia cheesemani (Broun, 1910)
 Adoxia croceicollis (Germar, 1848)
 Adoxia cyanescens (Broun, 1917)
 Adoxia dilatata (Broun, 1914)
 Adoxia dilucida (Broun, 1917)
 Adoxia dilutipes (Broun, 1915)
 Adoxia discrepans (Broun, 1914)
 Adoxia diversa (Broun, 1910)
 Adoxia femoralis (Allard, 1889)
 Adoxia foveigera (Broun, 1913)
 Adoxia fuscata (Broun, 1893)
 Adoxia fuscifrons (Broun, 1910)
 Adoxia gracilipes (Broun, 1917)
 Adoxia halli (Broun, 1917)
 Adoxia insolita (Broun, 1914)
 Adoxia iridescens (Broun, 1914)
 Adoxia lewisi (Broun, 1909)
 Adoxia mediocris (Broun, 1917)
 Adoxia minor (Broun, 1917)
 Adoxia modesta (Blackburn, 1888)
 Adoxia mollis (Broun, 1893)
 Adoxia monticola (Broun, 1893)
 Adoxia nigricans Broun, 1880
 Adoxia nigricornis (Sharp, 1886)
 Adoxia nitidicollis Broun, 1880
 Adoxia nodicollis (Broun, 1915)
 Adoxia obscura (Broun, 1910)
 Adoxia oconnori (Broun, 1913)
 Adoxia oleareae (Broun, 1893)
 Adoxia palialis (Broun, 1909)
 Adoxia perplexa (Broun, 1917)
 Adoxia princeps (Broun, 1893)
 Adoxia proletaria (Weise, 1924)
 Adoxia pubicollis (Broun, 1915)
 Adoxia puncticollis (Sharp, 1886)
 Adoxia quadricollis (Broun, 1917)
 Adoxia rectipes (Broun, 1893)
 Adoxia rugicollis (Broun, 1893)
 Adoxia scutellaris (Broun, 1909)
 Adoxia simmondsi (Broun, 1913)
 Adoxia somersetensis (Weise, 1916)
 Adoxia sordidula (Weise, 1924)
 Adoxia sulcifera (Broun, 1893)
 Adoxia truncata (Broun, 1893)
 Adoxia vestitus (Weise, 1924)
 Adoxia vilis (Weise, 1924)
 Adoxia viridis Broun, 1880
 Adoxia vulgaris Broun, 1880
 Adoxia xenoscelis (Broun, 1917)

References

Galerucinae
Chrysomelidae genera
Taxa named by Thomas Broun